WesBank Raceway was a motorsport facility situated at Germiston in the Gauteng province of South Africa. It was built on the site of a former horse racing track (Gosforth Park) opened in 2003.

The facility featured an oval track, dragstrip, road circuit and motorcross track, allowing for a wide range of events. It was so named due to a sponsorship deal with the South African WesBank company. The track closed in November 2007 after the property was sold to developers.

References

Motorsport venues in South Africa
Defunct sports venues in South Africa
Defunct motorsport venues
Defunct drag racing venues
History of Germiston
Sports venues in Gauteng
Sports venues completed in 2003
21st-century architecture in South Africa